Abeh-ye Sabzvariha (also Romanized as Ābeh-ye Sabzvārīhā; also known as Sabzevārī) is a village in Nezamabad Rural District, in the Central District of Azadshahr County, Golestan Province, Iran. At the 2006 census, its population was 703, in 163 families.

References 

Populated places in Azadshahr County